Black Elvis/Lost in Space is the fourth solo studio album by American rapper and producer Kool Keith, and his first release under the alias of 'Black Elvis'. It was intended to be released the same day as First Come, First Served, but was pushed back by Columbia Records and ended up being released four months later on August 10, 1999 through Relativity Entertainment Distribution rather than Sony Music Distribution, denoted by the WK prefix instead of the customary CK prefix and the legal copy on the release.

Background
Kool Keith uses very complex rhymes on various subject matters from Black Elvis' viewpoint on half of the album and on the other half elaborates on space travel and being lost in space. This is the first album for which Keith handled all of the production, although drum programming was done by Kutmasta Kurt and Marc Live. Sadat X, Black Silver, Roger Troutman, Motion Man, Kid Capri and Pimpin' Rex made guest appearances on the record.

A promotional video was made for the track "Livin' Astro" which aired on a few episodes of the MTV show Amp in early 2000. The video features Kool Keith acting as several different personas amidst a sci-fi backdrop that resembles the Black Elvis/Lost in Space album cover. The personas include the Original Black Elvis, Orange Man, the Kid in the Commercial, Lonnie Hendrex, and Light-Blue Cop.

Kool Keith was displeased with the lack of promotion for the Black Elvis project, and vented his frustrations about his label on the songs "Release Date" and "Test Press." He also published the e-mail addresses of several Ruffhouse executives, asking his fans to demand better promotion.

Reception
The album peaked at number 180 on the US Billboard 200, #74 on the Top R&B/Hip-Hop Albums, #10 on the Heatseekers Albums.

Track listing

Sample credits
Track 5 contains elements from "Come Go With Me" by Teddy Pendergrass (1979)
Track 8 contains elements from "Our House" by Madness (1982) 
Track 11 contains elements from "Snake" by Charles Earland (1973)
Track 16 contains elements from "You Used to Love Me" by Faith Evans (1995)

Personnel

Keith Matthew Thornton - vocals, lyrics, producer, executive producer
Jeremy Larner - executive producer, management
Nightcrawler - drum programming & co-producer (tracks: 5, 11, 15), programming (tracks: 3, 4, 6, 7, 10, 14)
Live 7 - programming (tracks: 1, 2, 8, 9, 12, 13, 16, 17)
Kurt Matlin - lyrics (tracks: 5, 11, 15)
Paul K. Laster - vocals & lyrics (track 15)
Manny Lecuona - mastering
Michael 'Bones' Malak - recording
Joseph Mario Nicolo - mixing
Richard C Essig - lacquer cut
Aimée MacAuley - art direction & design
F. Scott Schafer - photography
Estée Ochoa - design
Tim Devine - A&R
Christopher Rodgers - vocals (tracks: 1, 2)
Rex Colonel Doby Jr. - vocals (track 1)
Roger Troutman - vocals (track 6)
Derek Murphy - vocals (track 8)
David Anthony Love, Jr. - vocals (track 9)

Charts

References

External links

1999 albums
Columbia Records albums
Science fiction concept albums
Kool Keith albums
Ruffhouse Records albums